The following species in the flowering plant genus Limonium, often called sea-lavenders, statices, and marsh-rosemaries, are accepted by Plants of the World Online. About 70% of these species are endemic to the Mediterranean Basin.

Limonium × abnorme 
Limonium acuminatum 
Limonium acutifolium 
Limonium adilguneri 
Limonium admirabile 
Limonium aegaeum 
Limonium aegusae 
Limonium afghanicum 
Limonium afrum 
Limonium albarracinense 
Limonium albidum 
Limonium albomarginatum 
Limonium albuferae 
Limonium album 
Limonium alcudianum 
Limonium algarvense 
Limonium algusae 
Limonium alicunense 
Limonium alleizettei 
Limonium altum 
Limonium alutaceum 
Limonium × ambiguum 
Limonium ammophilon 
Limonium amoenum 
Limonium amopicum 
Limonium ampuriense 
Limonium anatolicum 
Limonium anglicum 
Limonium angustebracteatum 
Limonium anthericoides 
Limonium antipaxorum 
Limonium antonii-llorensii 
Limonium aphroditae 
Limonium aragonense 
Limonium arboreum 
Limonium archeothirae 
Limonium arcuatum 
Limonium arenosum 
Limonium argentarium 
Limonium articulatum 
Limonium artruchium 
Limonium asparagoides 
Limonium asperrimum 
Limonium asterotrichum 
Limonium astypaleanum 
Limonium athinense 
Limonium atticum 
Limonium aucheri 
Limonium aureum 
Limonium auriculae-ursifolium 
Limonium auriculifolium 
Limonium australe 
Limonium avei 
Limonium axillare 
Limonium bahamense 
Limonium balearicum 
Limonium barceloi 
Limonium battandieri 
Limonium bellidifolium 
Limonium benmageci 
Limonium bianorii 
Limonium bicolor 
Limonium biflorum 
Limonium billardierei 
Limonium binervosum 
Limonium bocconei 
Limonium boirae 
Limonium boitardii 
Limonium bollei 
Limonium bolosii 
Limonium bonafei 
Limonium bonduellei 
Limonium bonifaciense 
Limonium botschantzevii 
Limonium bourgeaui 
Limonium brasiliense 
Limonium brassicifolium 
Limonium braunii 
Limonium brevipetiolatum 
Limonium britannicum 
Limonium brunneri 
Limonium brusnicense 
Limonium brutium 
Limonium bulgaricum 
Limonium bungei 
Limonium busianum 
Limonium byzacium 
Limonium caesium 
Limonium calabrum 
Limonium calaminare 
Limonium calanchicola 
Limonium calcarae 
Limonium calcicola 
Limonium californicum 
Limonium callianthum 
Limonium calliopsium 
Limonium cambrense 
Limonium camposanum 
Limonium cancellatum 
Limonium cantianum 
Limonium capense 
Limonium capitis-eliae 
Limonium capitis-marci 
Limonium caprariae 
Limonium caprariense 
Limonium carisae 
Limonium carnosum 
Limonium carolinianum 
Limonium carpathum 
Limonium carpetanicum 
Limonium carregadorense 
Limonium carthaginense 
Limonium carvalhoi 
Limonium caspium 
Limonium castellonense 
Limonium catalaunicum 
Limonium catanense 
Limonium catanzaroi 
Limonium cavanillesii 
Limonium cazzae 
Limonium cedrorum 
Limonium celticum 
Limonium cephalonicum 
Limonium cercinense 
Limonium chazaliei 
Limonium chersonesum 
Limonium chrisianum 
Limonium chrysocomum 
Limonium chrysopotamicum 
Limonium clupeanum 
Limonium cofrentanum 
Limonium × coincyi 
Limonium comosum 
Limonium compactum 
Limonium companyonis 
Limonium confertum 
Limonium confusum 
Limonium congestum 
Limonium connivens 
Limonium contortirameum 
Limonium contractum 
Limonium coombense 
Limonium cophanense 
Limonium coralliforme 
Limonium coralloides 
Limonium cordatum 
Limonium cordovillense 
Limonium × coriacifolium 
Limonium corinthiacum 
Limonium cornarianum 
Limonium cornubiense 
Limonium coronense 
Limonium corsicum 
Limonium cossonianum 
Limonium costae 
Limonium cosyrense 
Limonium crateriforme 
Limonium cretaceum 
Limonium creticum 
Limonium cumanum 
Limonium cunicularium 
Limonium cylindrifolium 
Limonium cymuliferum 
Limonium cyprium 
Limonium cyrenaicum 
Limonium cyrtostachyum 
Limonium cythereum 
Limonium dagmariae 
Limonium damboldtianum 
Limonium daveaui 
Limonium davisii 
Limonium decumbens 
Limonium delicatulum 
Limonium dendroides 
Limonium densiflorum 
Limonium densissimum 
Limonium depauperatum 
Limonium devoniense 
Limonium dianium 
Limonium dichotomum 
Limonium dichroanthum 
Limonium dictyophorum 
Limonium didimense 
Limonium dielsianum 
Limonium diomedeum 
Limonium dodartiforme 
Limonium doerfleri 
Limonium × dolcheri 
Limonium dolihiense 
Limonium donetzicum 
Limonium doriae 
Limonium dragonericum 
Limonium dregeanum 
Limonium drepanostachyum 
Limonium dubium 
Limonium dufourii 
Limonium durieui 
Limonium duriusculum 
Limonium dyeri 
Limonium ebusitanum 
Limonium echioides 
Limonium effusum 
Limonium ejulabilis 
Limonium elaphonisicum 
Limonium elfahsianum 
Limonium emarginatum 
Limonium equisetinum 
Limonium × erectiflorum 
Limonium × escarrei 
Limonium estevei 
Limonium etruscum 
Limonium eugeniae 
Limonium failachicum 
Limonium fajzievii 
Limonium fallax 
Limonium ferganense 
Limonium fesianum 
Limonium fischeri 
Limonium flagellare 
Limonium flexuosum 
Limonium florentinum 
Limonium fontqueri 
Limonium formenterae 
Limonium formosum 
Limonium fradinianum 
Limonium fragile 
Limonium franchetii 
Limonium frederici 
Limonium frutescens 
Limonium furfuraceum 
Limonium furnarii 
Limonium gabrieli 
Limonium galilaeum 
Limonium gallurense 
Limonium gibertii 
Limonium ginzbergeri 
Limonium girardianum 
Limonium globuliferum 
Limonium glomeratum 
Limonium gmelini 
Limonium gorgonae 
Limonium gougetianum 
Limonium grabusae 
Limonium graecum 
Limonium greuteri 
Limonium grosii 
Limonium guaicuru 
Limonium gueneri 
Limonium guigliae 
Limonium gymnesicum 
Limonium halophilum 
Limonium helenae 
Limonium heraionense 
Limonium herculis 
Limonium hermaeum 
Limonium heterospicatum 
Limonium hibericum 
Limonium hibernicum 
Limonium hierapetrae 
Limonium himariense 
Limonium hipponense 
Limonium hirsuticalyx 
Limonium hoeltzeri 
Limonium humile 
Limonium hungaricum 
Limonium hyblaeum 
Limonium hypanicum 
Limonium iconicum 
Limonium ikaricum 
Limonium ilergabonum 
Limonium ilvae 
Limonium imbricatum 
Limonium inarimense 
Limonium inexpectans 
Limonium insigne 
Limonium insulare 
Limonium intercedens 
Limonium interjectum 
Limonium intermedium 
Limonium intricatum 
Limonium ionicum 
Limonium iranicum 
Limonium irtaensis 
Limonium isidorum 
Limonium issaeum 
Limonium istriacum 
Limonium ithacense 
Limonium jankae 
Limonium japygicum 
Limonium jovibarba 
Limonium kairouanum 
Limonium kardamylii 
Limonium kaschgaricum 
Limonium kimmericum 
Limonium kirikosicum 
Limonium kobstanicum 
Limonium korakonisicum 
Limonium korbousense 
Limonium kraussianum 
Limonium kurgantjubense 
Limonium lacertosum 
Limonium lacinium 
Limonium lacostei 
Limonium laetum 
Limonium lagostanum 
Limonium lambinonii 
Limonium latebracteatum 
Limonium lausianum 
Limonium laxiusculum 
Limonium legrandii 
Limonium leonardi-llorensii 
Limonium leprosorum 
Limonium leptolobum 
Limonium leptophyllum 
Limonium letourneuxii 
Limonium liberianum 
Limonium liburnicum 
Limonium lilacinum 
Limonium lilybaeum 
Limonium limbatum 
Limonium linifolium 
Limonium lobatum 
Limonium lobetanicum 
Limonium lobinii 
Limonium loganicum 
Limonium lojaconoi 
Limonium longibracteatum 
Limonium longifolium 
Limonium lopadusanum 
Limonium lovricii 
Limonium lowei 
Limonium × lucentinum 
Limonium macrophyllum 
Limonium macrorrhizum 
Limonium magallufianum 
Limonium majoricum 
Limonium majus 
Limonium malacitanum 
Limonium malfatanicum 
Limonium mansanetianum 
Limonium marisolii 
Limonium maritimum 
Limonium marmarisense 
Limonium maroccanum 
Limonium mateoi 
Limonium maurocordatae 
Limonium mazarae 
Limonium meandrinum 
Limonium medium 
Limonium melancholicum 
Limonium melitense 
Limonium menigense 
Limonium merxmuelleri 
Limonium messeniacum 
Limonium michelsonii 
Limonium microcycladicum 
Limonium migjornense 
Limonium milleri 
Limonium milovicii 
Limonium minoicum 
Limonium minoricense 
Limonium minus 
Limonium minutiflorum 
Limonium minutum 
Limonium monolithicum 
Limonium montis-christi 
Limonium morisianum 
Limonium mouretii 
Limonium mouterdei 
Limonium mucronatum 
Limonium mucronulatum 
Limonium multiceps 
Limonium multiflorum 
Limonium multiforme 
Limonium muradense 
Limonium mutabile 
Limonium mutatum 
Limonium myrianthum 
Limonium namaquanum 
Limonium naniforme 
Limonium narbonense 
Limonium narynense 
Limonium neapolense 
Limonium × neumanii 
Limonium normannicum 
Limonium nudum 
Limonium obesifolium 
Limonium oblanceolatum 
Limonium obtusifolium 
Limonium ocymifolium 
Limonium oleifolium 
Limonium oligotrichum 
Limonium omissae 
Limonium optimae 
Limonium opulentum 
Limonium orellii 
Limonium oristanum 
Limonium ornatum 
Limonium otolepis 
Limonium oudayense 
Limonium ovalifolium 
Limonium pachynense 
Limonium pagasaeum 
Limonium palmare 
Limonium palmyrense 
Limonium pandatariae 
Limonium panormitanum 
Limonium papillatum 
Limonium paradoxum 
Limonium paramedium 
Limonium parosicum 
Limonium parvibracteatum 
Limonium parvifolium 
Limonium parvum 
Limonium patrimoniense 
Limonium paulayanum 
Limonium pavonianum 
Limonium pectinatum 
Limonium pelagosae 
Limonium peregrinum 
Limonium perezii 
Limonium × pericotii 
Limonium perplexum 
Limonium pescadense 
Limonium peucetium 
Limonium pharense 
Limonium pharosianum 
Limonium phitosianum 
Limonium pigadiense 
Limonium pinillense 
Limonium planesiae 
Limonium platyphyllum 
Limonium plurisquamatum 
Limonium poimenum 
Limonium pomelianum 
Limonium pomoense 
Limonium pontium 
Limonium ponzoi 
Limonium popovii 
Limonium portlandicum 
Limonium portopetranum 
Limonium portovecchiense 
Limonium postii 
Limonium potaninii 
Limonium preauxii 
Limonium procerum 
Limonium proliferum 
Limonium protohermaeum 
Limonium pruinosum 
Limonium pseudarticulatum 
Limonium pseudebusitanum 
Limonium × pseudoconfusum 
Limonium pseudodictyocladum 
Limonium pseudolaetum 
Limonium pseudominutum 
Limonium pseudotranswallianum 
Limonium puberulum 
Limonium pujosii 
Limonium pulviniforme 
Limonium punicum 
Limonium purpuratum 
Limonium pusillum 
Limonium pylium 
Limonium pyramidatum 
Limonium quesadense 
Limonium quinnii 
Limonium racemosum 
Limonium ramosissimum 
Limonium recticaule 
Limonium recurvum 
Limonium redivivum 
Limonium relicticum 
Limonium remotispiculum 
Limonium reniforme 
Limonium reticulatum 
Limonium retirameum 
Limonium retusum 
Limonium revolutum 
Limonium rezniczenkoanum 
Limonium rhodense 
Limonium rigidum 
Limonium rigualii 
Limonium roridum 
Limonium rosselloi 
Limonium rubescens 
Limonium ruizii 
Limonium rumicifolium 
Limonium rungsii 
Limonium sabulicola 
Limonium salmonis 
Limonium samium 
Limonium sanctamargaritense 
Limonium santapolense 
Limonium saracinatum 
Limonium sarcophyllum 
Limonium sareptanum 
Limonium sarniense 
Limonium sartorianum 
Limonium savianum 
Limonium saxicola 
Limonium saxonicum 
Limonium scabrum 
Limonium schinousae 
Limonium scoparium 
Limonium scopulorum 
Limonium scorpioides 
Limonium secundirameum 
Limonium selinuntinum 
Limonium senkakuense 
Limonium × sennenii 
Limonium serpentinicum 
Limonium serratum 
Limonium sibthorpianum 
Limonium sieberi 
Limonium silvestrei 
Limonium sinense 
Limonium sinisicum 
Limonium sinuatum 
Limonium sirinicum 
Limonium sitiacum 
Limonium smithii 
Limonium soboliferum 
Limonium sogdianum 
Limonium sokotranum 
Limonium solanderi 
Limonium sommierianum 
Limonium sougiae 
Limonium spathulatum 
Limonium spectabile 
Limonium spreitzenhoferi 
Limonium squarrosum 
Limonium stenophyllum 
Limonium stenotatum 
Limonium steppicum 
Limonium stocksii 
Limonium strictissimum 
Limonium subanfractum 
Limonium subglabrum 
Limonium subnudum 
Limonium subrotundifolium 
Limonium sucronicum 
Limonium suffruticosum 
Limonium sulcitanum 
Limonium sundingii 
Limonium supinum 
Limonium sventenii 
Limonium syracusanum 
Limonium tabernense 
Limonium tabulare 
Limonium tacapense 
Limonium taenari 
Limonium tamaricoides 
Limonium tamarindanum 
Limonium tarcoense 
Limonium tauromenitanum 
Limonium tenellum 
Limonium tenoreanum 
Limonium tenuicaule 
Limonium tenuiculum 
Limonium teretifolium 
Limonium tetragonum 
Limonium teuchirae 
Limonium thaenicum 
Limonium thiniense 
Limonium thirae 
Limonium tianschanicum 
Limonium tibulatium 
Limonium tigulianum 
Limonium tineoi 
Limonium tobarrense 
Limonium todaroanum 
Limonium toletanum 
Limonium tomentellum 
Limonium tournefortii 
Limonium trachycladum 
Limonium transcanalis 
Limonium transwallisnum 
Limonium tremolsii 
Limonium trinajsticii 
Limonium tritonianum 
Limonium trojae 
Limonium tschurjukiense 
Limonium tuberculatum 
Limonium tubiflorum 
Limonium tunetanum 
Limonium tyrrhenicum 
Limonium ugijarense 
Limonium ursanum 
Limonium usticanum 
Limonium vaccarii 
Limonium × valentinum 
Limonium validum 
Limonium vanandense 
Limonium vanense 
Limonium velutinum 
Limonium vestitum 
Limonium viciosoi 
Limonium vigaroense 
Limonium vigoi 
Limonium viniolae 
Limonium × virgatoformis 
Limonium virgatum 
Limonium vravronense 
Limonium vulgare 
Limonium wendelboi 
Limonium wessexense 
Limonium wiedmannii 
Limonium wrightii 
Limonium xerocamposicum 
Limonium xerophilum 
Limonium xiliense 
Limonium xipholepis 
Limonium zacynthium 
Limonium zankii 
Limonium zanonii 
Limonium zembrae 
Limonium zeugitanum

References

Limonium